Yves Allegro and Michael Kohlmann were the defending champions, but Kohlmann did not participate this year.  Allegro partnered Stanislas Wawrinka, losing in the quarterfinals.

Andrei Pavel and Rogier Wassen won in the final 6–3, 5–7, [10–4], against Simon Aspelin and Todd Perry.

Seeds

Draw

Draw

External links
Draw

2006 Heineken Open
2006 ATP Tour